Porta San Vitale, sometimes known as Porta per Ravenna, was an eastern portal of the former outer medieval walls of the city of Bologna, Italy.  It is located on a piazza of the same name, immediately west of the intersection of Via San Vitale with the Viale di Ciconvallazione.

History
First erected in 1286, with an adjacent barracks and a tower. The tower was demolished in the early 16th century. Formerly the gate had a moat and ravelin on the exterior side. At the end of 18th century the drawbridge was demolished. Between 1950 and 1952, that is the removal of the exterior forepart and ravelin.

References

Buildings and structures completed in the 13th century